Isolde Barth (24 August 1948 in Maxdorf, Rhineland-Palatinate (Germany) is a German movie, theater and television actress. She appeared in over 60 films between 1968 and 2013. In 1968 she first appeared in a minor role in the German comedy . She also appeared in Group Portrait with a Lady (1977), directed by Aleksandar Petrović and starring Romy Schneider.

Career
Isolde Maria Theresa Barth played already during her school time at Ursulinen-Gymnasium Mannheim small roles at National Theatre Mannheim. She began her acting training at Staatlichen Hochschule für Musik und darstellende Kunst (University of Music and Performing Arts) Stuttgart and then moved on to the Folkwang University of the Arts Essen. She graduated in summer 1970.

Barth is an internationally known actress. Among many movies she played in the mini-series Holocaust (1978) for American television. She played in Ingmar Bergman's The Serpent's Egg (1977), several productions by Rainer Werner Fassbinder, and in The Young Indiana Jones Chronicles (1991) which was created by George Lucas. In addition to her film roles Isolde Barth was also seen repeatedly in German and French TV productions and series.

In 2007 Isolde Barth was inducted into the Deutsche Filmakademie. Since 2009 she is a member of the jury of the Bavarian Film Awards.

Personal life
Isolde Barth lives in Munich.

Credits

Film 
This is only a selection, not a complete list of Barth's movies:

Television

Stage

References

External links

German film actresses
German television actresses
20th-century German actresses
21st-century German actresses
1948 births
Living people